NGC 310 is a star located in the constellation Cetus. It was recorded on December 31, 1866, by Robert Ball.

References

0310
18661231
Cetus (constellation)